Face's Music Party is an American children's television series produced by Jonas & Co., Nickelodeon Productions and Nickelodeon Animation Studio that premiered on Nickelodeon on June 3, 2022.

Premise 
The series is hosted by longtime Nick Jr. mascot Face, now voiced by Cedric L. Williams. Face VJs modern pop hits and revamped nursery rhymes in this series, combining animation and live action.

Episodes

References

External links 
 
 

2020s American animated television series
2020s American children's television series
2020s Nickelodeon original programming
2020s preschool education television series
2022 American television series debuts
American children's animated musical television series
American children's musical television series
American television series with live action and animation
Animated preschool education television series
Dance television shows
English-language television shows